NGC 100 is a galaxy located approximately 60 million light-years from the Solar System in the constellation Pisces. It has an apparent magnitude of 13.2. It was first discovered on 10 November 1885 by American astronomer Lewis Swift.

See also 
 List of NGC objects (1–1000)
 Pisces (constellation)

References

External links 
 
 
 SEDS

18851110
0100
0231
NGC 0100
Discoveries by Lewis Swift